Chimney is a hamlet on the River Thames near Shifford Lock,  south of Witney in Oxfordshire. It is part of the civil parish of Aston, Cote, Shifford and Chimney.  Chimney Meadows  is the largest nature reserve managed by the Berkshire, Buckinghamshire and Oxfordshire Wildlife Trust.

History
Chimney's toponym is derived from Old English, meaning "Island of a man named Ceomma". A large Anglo-Saxon cemetery, in use from the mid 10th century to the mid 11th century, has been found west of Chimney Farm. Chimney has been a small settlement since then. There were about 18 households in the 13th century, and the population reached a peak of 46 in 1821. In 1931, the last year for which separate figures are available, the population was 24.  

Two late 17th century cottages at Chimney Farm have been designated as Grade II listed buildings, as has the Lower Farmhouse.  Until the 19th century Chimney was a township in the parish of Bampton. It was made a separate civil parish in 1866. In 1931 the parish was united with Aston and Cote to form Aston Bampton, which was united with Shifford in 1954 to form the parish of Aston Bampton and Shifford, later renamed Aston, Cote, Shifford and Chimney.

Geography

The area lies on alluvial deposits from the River Thames producing calcareous clayey soils of the Thames series. Chimney Meadows is a  national nature reserve and Site of Special Scientific Interest which forms part of the floodplain of the River Thames. It includes wild flower meadows with cowslip, yellow rattle, common knapweed, oxeye daisy and pepper-saxifrage which supports insects, wildfowl and waders. It is the largest nature reserve managed by the Berkshire, Buckinghamshire and Oxfordshire Wildlife Trust, who took it over in 2003.

References

Sources

External links

BBOWT: Chimney Meadows nature reserve

Villages in Oxfordshire
Sites of Special Scientific Interest in Oxfordshire
West Oxfordshire District
Former civil parishes in Oxfordshire